Florangel Rosario-Braid is a Filipina writer, educator, and constitutionalist, who was a member of the Philippine Constitutional Commission of 1986. She served as president and executive dean, currently president emeritus of the Asian Institute of Journalism and Communication (AIJC).

Education
She completed her bachelor's degree from the University of the Philippines and her M.S. and Ph.D. degrees from Syracuse University, New York, in Mass communication.

Career
Rosario-Braid is a trustee, senior adviser, and former president of the Asian Institute of Journalism and Communication. She also became an executive dean from 1980 to 2001. She authored works on communication, education, cooperatives, science and technology, NGOs, and human rights. She became a chair of Philippine Social Science Council. She was also a regular columnist at the Manila Bulletin and also a former president and member of founding directors at the Philippine Daily Inquirer.

Framer of 1987 Constitution
She was one of the selected framers of the Philippine Constitutional Commission of 1986 by former President Corazon Aquino.

Together with Christian Monsod, Adolfo Azcuna, Hilario Davide Jr., Ed Garcia, Jose Luis Gascon, Ricardo Romulo, Jaime S.L. Tadeo, and Bernardo Villegas, Rosario-Braid was one of the remaining-surviving framers who denounced the burial of Ferdinand Marcos burial at the Libingan ng mga Bayani. She supported the Bangsamoro Law and also condemned the Anti-Terror Bill signed by Rodrigo Duterte.

Personal life
She was married to Dr. Andrew F. Braid, an international development executive. They have four children, 10 grandchildren, and five great-grandchildren.

She also has an exhibit of her paintings.

See also
Philippine Star
Philippine Constitutional Commission of 1986
CAP College Foundation
TOFIL Award

Works
Books
 Communication Strategies for Productivity Improvement

Edited works
 Crimes and Unpunishment: The Killing of Filipino Journalists

References

Filipino women academics
Filipino political scientists
Living people
University of the Philippines alumni
Syracuse University alumni
Year of birth missing (living people)
Place of birth missing (living people)
Women political scientists
Members of the Philippine Constitutional Commission of 1986